St Mary's Church is the parish church of the town of Lutterworth, Leicestershire. The church building is 13th-century, with 14th- and 15th-century alterations. A spire on the church was blown down in 1703 and rebuilt in 1761. Sir George Gilbert Scott restored the building in 1866–1869. It is listed at Grade I.

The translator John Wycliffe was the rector of the church between 1374 and 1384. His translation of the Bible into English started the Lollard movement. 
St Mary's is a member of the Major Churches Network.

References

External links
Lutterworth Church

Church of England church buildings in Leicestershire
St Mary's Church
13th-century church buildings in England
Lutterworth